The 1949 Thomas Cup was the inaugural tournament of Thomas Cup, the most important men's badminton team competition in the world. 

The tournament was originally planned  for 1941–1942 (badminton seasons in the northern hemisphere traditionally ran from the autumn of one calendar year to the spring of the next), but was delayed when World War II exploded across the continents. Sir George's dream was finally realized in 1948-1949 when ten national teams participated in the first Thomas Cup competition. 

Three qualifying zones were established: Pan America, Europe, and the Pacific; though Malaya (now Malaysia and Singapore) was the only Pacific zone participant. In a format that would last until 1984, all ties (matches between nations) would consist of nine individual matches; the victorious nation needing to win at least five of these contests. The top two singles player of each side faced both of the top two players  for the opposite side, accounting for four matches. A fifth singles match took place between the third ranked singles players for each team. Finally, two doubles pairings for each side played both of the doubles pairings of the opposite side, accounting for four more matches. Each tie was normally contested over two days, four matches on the first day and five on the next. The United States and Denmark won their respective zone qualifications and thus joined Malaya for the inter-zone ties.  

The inter-zone ties were held in the United Kingdom. As the tournament used a knockout system, rather than a round-robin system, Denmark was given a bye in the first round. Malaya defeated the USA 6–3 in a highly competitive match played in Glasgow, Scotland (none of the players on either side had ever seen any of the players on the other side play before). Of note, this tie marked the first of only three ever matches between the USA's Dave Freeman and Malaya's Wong Peng Soon the two greatest singles players of the early post-war period. In the final round held in Preston, England, Malaya beat Denmark 8–1 and became the first nation to win a Thomas Cup.

Teams
Only three teams from three regions took part in the Inter-Zone ties. Malaya did not participate in qualification rounds but got through to the final.

Americas

Pacific

Europe

Knockout stages

First round
Despite only 3 teams playing in the tournament, Denmark was given a bye in the first round and went automatically into the final.

Final round

Notelist

References

External links
 tangkis.tripod.com
 Mike's Badminton Populorum 

Thomas Cup
Thomas & Uber Cup
Thomas
T
Thomas Cup, 1949
Thomas Cup
Thomas Cup